Anna Maria Mucha (born 26 April 1980) is a Polish film and television actress and journalist. She is best known to Western audiences as the character of Danka Dresner in the film Schindler's List directed by Steven Spielberg. In Poland she is known for her regular role in soap opera M jak miłość (2003–present).

The winner of the Polish version of 10th season of Dancing with the Stars - Taniec z Gwiazdami. In 2010 she became a member of the jury in the Polish version of So You Think You Can Dance (You can dance: Po prostu tańcz).

Mucha posed nude in the October 2009 edition of Polish Playboy.

Early life 
Anna Mucha was born and grew up in Warsaw. She graduated from Stefan Batory's Gimnazjum and Liceum in 1999.

Career 
In 1990, she was cast as Sabinka in Korczak (directed by Andrzej Wajda) about Polish-Jewish humanitarian Janusz Korczak. That year she appeared in Femina (directed by Piotr Szulkin), in which she co-starred with Alina Janowska. The most important role of her career came when she was cast in Schindler's List directed by Steven Spielberg followed by several other roles in films such as Miss Nobody (1996), Mlode wilki 1/2 (1997) and Life as a Fatal Sexually Transmitted Disease (2000, directed by Krzysztof Zanussi). She then appeared in her role of a prostitute named Lili in Chłopaki nie płaczą in 2000 and made no movie appearances for another 10 years.

Mucha also starred in a few Polish TV shows in the 1990s, including Kuchnia polska (1992), Bank nie z tej ziemi (1994) and Matki, żony i kochanki (1995, 1998). Since 2003 she has been a member of the main cast of M jak miłość.

Anna Mucha returned to acting in films in 2011. She played the role of a lesbian named Mira in the comedy Och, Karol 2.

Filmography

Taniec z Gwiazdami
Anna Mucha won the 10th season of Polish Dancing with the Stars - Taniec z Gwiazdami.

External links 

 Anna Mucha Official Website
 
 Schindler's List Official Website

1980 births
Polish actresses
Polish child actresses
Living people
Actresses from Warsaw
Dancing with the Stars: Taniec z gwiazdami
Mucha